Cheyenne Parker (born June 9, 1987) is an American television personality, model, fashion designer, and business owner. He appeared on reality television programs Fire Island and Ex on the Beach. Following those appearances he has continued to work as a model and has launched a clothing brand and luxury concierge service.

Career

Having established a career as a model, and having appeared on an episode of Shahs of Sunset in 2012, Parker was invited to join the cast of Fire Island in 2017 but initially declined. He subsequently agreed to join the cast, and then appeared on season two of Ex on the Beach.

He has modeled for magazines such as DNA.

In 2019 he launched Maison Parker (which translates to "House of Parker" in French) a furniture design business which has since expanded to include fashion design. In 2021 he established Leisure in Life, a luxury concierge service in Mexico.

Personal life

Parker is openly gay and is an advocate for the LGBTQ+ community. He had planned to return to the United States in 2021 after a period working abroad, but a COVID-19 scare resulted in him re-routing to Mexico. He now resides at Puerto Vallarta, a Mexican "queer resort".

Filmography

References

External links
 
 
 

Living people
1987 births
American television personalities
American women television personalities
Gay models
LGBT people from California
Participants in American reality television series
21st-century LGBT people